USS LST-205 was a  in the United States Navy during World War II.

Construction and career 
LST-205 was laid down on 5 August 1942 at Chicago Bridge and Iron Co., Seneca, Indiana. Launched on 12 April 1943 and commissioned on 15 May 1943.

During World War II, LST-205 was assigned to the Asiatic-Pacific theater. She took part in the Gilbert Islands operations from 21 November to 8 December 1943.

She was present during the West Loch disaster and she was moored with LST-69, LST-225, LST-274, LST-43, LST-179, LST-353, and LST-39. No crew members were lost aboard the ship during that disaster. She was then sent to take part in the Battle of Biak Island from 9 to 13 June 1944. The ship again took part in the Battle of Saipan from 17 June to 3 July 1944 and the Leyte landings from 20 October and 19 to 29 November 1944.

On 15 September 1945, she was redesigned as a hospital tank landing ship.

LST-205 was decommissioned on 2 April 1946 and struck from the Navy Register on 5 June later that year.

On 4 June 1948, she was sold for scrap to Hughes Bros., Inc., New York City, New York.

Gallery

Awards 
LST-205 have earned the following awards:

China Service Medal
American Campaign Medal
Asiatic-Pacific Campaign Medal (4 battle stars)
World War II Victory Medal
Navy Occupation Service Medal (with Asia clasp)
Philippines Presidential Unit Citation
Philippine Liberation Medal (1 award)

Citations

Sources 
 
 
 
 

World War II amphibious warfare vessels of the United States
Ships built in Seneca, Illinois
1943 ships
LST-1-class tank landing ships of the United States Navy